Zhang Xiaoling, better known by his stage name Zhang Yibai (born 14 April 1963, in Chongqing, China) is a Chinese film director, screenwriter and producer.

Directorial career
Zhang began his career in television and music videos before directing his debut, Spring Subway in 2002.

Zhang, like many other modern Chinese directors, has focused primarily on life in modern Chinese cities. Spring Subway, for example, follows its protagonist as he wanders through Beijing's subway system, while the mystery-thriller Curiosity Killed the Cat follows its characters through the central China boomtown of Chongqing (also Zhang's hometown).

His next two films, 2007's The Longest Night in Shanghai and 2008's Lost, Indulgence have seen the director's exposure and successes extending increasingly overseas. Longest Night, starring Zhao Wei, constitutes one of the first China-Japan coproductions, while Lost was selected to premiere at New York City's Tribeca Film Festival in 2008.

Filmography

References

External links
 
 
 Zhang Yibai at the Chinese Movie Database

Film directors from Chongqing
1963 births
Living people
Chinese film directors
Central Academy of Drama alumni